The Tortonian is in the geologic time scale an age or stage of the late Miocene that spans the time between 11.608 ± 0.005 Ma and 7.246 ± 0.005 Ma (million years ago). It follows the Serravallian and is followed by the Messinian.

The Tortonian roughly overlaps with the regional Pannonian Stage of the Paratethys timescale of Central Europe. It also overlaps the upper Astaracian, Vallesian and lower Turolian European land mammal ages, the upper Clarendonian and lower Hemphillian North American land mammal ages and the upper Chasicoan and lower Huayquerian South American land mammal ages.

Definition
The Tortonian was introduced by Swiss stratigrapher Karl Mayer-Eymar in 1858. It was named after the Italian city of Tortona in the region Piedmont.

The base of the Tortonian Stage is at the last common appearance of calcareous nanoplankton Discoaster kugleri and planktonic foram Globigerinoides subquadratus. It is also associated with the short normal polarized magnetic chronozone C5r.2n. A GSSP for the Tortonian has been established in the Monte dei Corvi section near Ancona (Italy).

The top of the Tortonian (the base of the Messinian) is at the first appearance of the planktonic foram species Globorotalia conomiozea and is stratigraphically in the middle of magnetic chronozone C3Br.1r.

Geologic history
In 2020, geologists reported two newly-identified supervolcano eruptions associated with the Yellowstone hotspot track, including the region's largest and most cataclysmic event – the Grey's Landing super-eruption – which had a volume of at least 2,800 km3 and occurred around 8.72 Ma.

References

Notes

Literature

; 2004: A Geologic Time Scale 2004, Cambridge University Press.
; 2005: The Global boundary Stratotype Section and Point (GSSP) of the Tortonian Stage (Upper Miocene) at Monte Dei Corvi, Episodes 28, p. 6-17.
; 1858: Versuch einer neuen Klassifikation der Tertiär-Gebilde Europa’s, Verhandlungen der Schweizerischen Naturforschenden Gesellschaft, Jahresversammlung 1857, p. 70–71 & 165–199.

External links
GeoWhen Database - Tortonian
Neogene timescale, at the website of the subcommission for stratigraphic information of the ICS
 Neogene timescale at the website of the Norwegian network of offshore records of geology and stratigraphy

 
05
 
Miocene geochronology
Geological ages